Tanner Springs, historically also known as La Xara Springs and Ojo La Xara, is a populated place situated in Apache County, Arizona, United States.

References

Populated places in Apache County, Arizona